Fittstown is an unincorporated community in Pontotoc County, Oklahoma, United States. Fittstown has a post office with ZIP code 74842.

Demographics

References

Unincorporated communities in Pontotoc County, Oklahoma
Unincorporated communities in Oklahoma